In enzymology, an acetate—CoA ligase (ADP-forming) is an enzyme that catalyzes the chemical reaction

ATP + acetate + CoA  ADP + phosphate + acetyl-CoA

The 3 substrates of this enzyme are ATP, acetate, and CoA, whereas its 3 products are ADP, phosphate, and acetyl-CoA.

This enzyme belongs to the family of ligases, specifically those forming carbon-sulfur bonds as acid-thiol ligases.  The systematic name of this enzyme class is acetate:CoA ligase (ADP-forming). Other names in common use include acetyl-CoA synthetase (ADP-forming), acetyl coenzyme A synthetase (adenosine diphosphate-forming), and acetate thiokinase.  This enzyme participates in pyruvate metabolism and propanoate metabolism.

References

 

EC 6.2.1
Enzymes of unknown structure